was a village located in Agatsuma District, Gunma Prefecture, Japan.

As of September 1, 2007, the village had an estimated population of 1,788 and a population density of 9.41 persons per km². The total area was 202.81 km².

On March 28, 2010, Kuni was merged into the expanded town of Nakanojō.

Geography
Over half of the total area is covered by forests. Located on the border of Gunma Prefecture and Nagano Prefecture is Lake Nozori. There were two major hot springs in the village: the Shiriyaki and Hanashiki Hot Springs.

Surrounding municipalities
 Gunma Prefecture
 Kusatsu
 Nakanojō
 Naganohara
 Higashiagatsuma
 Nagano Prefecture
 Sakae
 Yamanouchi
 Takayama
 Niigata Prefecture
 Yuzawa

History
 1889 - Kusatsu village is created in Agatsuma District.
 1900 - Kusatsu village is divided into Kusatsu town and Kuni village
 March 28, 2010 - Kuni was merged into the expanded town of Nakanojō.

Name origin
Before the creation of Kusatsu village in 1889, there were six villages, called Akaiwa, Kosame, Hikage, Ooshi, Iriyama, and Irusu. When thinking of a name in 1900, Kuni, meaning six put together (六合), was chosen since there were six villages. The pronunciation of the village's name came from the Nihon Shoki.

External links
 Nakanojō official website 

Dissolved municipalities of Gunma Prefecture
Nakanojō, Gunma